Haliyadda is a village in Sri Lanka. It is located within the Kandy district of Central Province. The campaign of Danture took place 1.2 kilometres away (0.75 mi), and the sacred city of Kandy is another nearby historical site.

See also
List of towns in Central Province, Sri Lanka

References

External links

Government map of Kandy District, Sri Lanka

Populated places in Kandy District